Breelong, New South Wales is a bounded rural locality of Gilgandra Shire and a civil parish of Gowen County, New South Wales.

Geography
The Parish is on the junction of the Wallumburrawang Creek and the Castlereagh River, and the nearest settlement of the parish is Gilgandra, New South Wales to the west. The main economic activity of the parish is agriculture

History
The parish is on the traditional lands of Weilwan aboriginal peoples.

On 20 July 1900, an indigenous man, Jimmy Governor, murdered four members of the Mawbey family, and the children's governess, at their farming property in the area of Breelong. The story of the murders received great publicity at the time. and became the basis in 1972 of a fictional work by Thomas Keneally in his book The Chant of Jimmie Blacksmith.

References

Localities in New South Wales
Geography of New South Wales
Central West (New South Wales)